Navid Mashinchi ( Navīd Māšīn Cī) is the retired German-born Canadian soccer player, who played for the Vancouver Whitecaps. Following his playing career, he worked in the analytics department as a performance analyst for the Vancouver Whitecaps FC of Major League Soccer. Mashinchi graduated with a Data Science Master's degree from the University of Denver , and is currently working as a data scientist at Kohl's.

Player Career
Mashinchi began his career in Germany, playing in the U-15 and U-17 teams of German third division club Fortuna Düsseldorf.

After moving with his family to Canada, Mashinchi joined the Vancouver Whitecaps residency program, simultaneously playing club soccer with the Westside FC Rangers U-21 side of the Vancouver Metro Soccer League U-21 Division. Mashinchi scored 14 goals in 15 games for Westside in 2006.

Mashinchi played with the Vancouver Whitecaps Residency in Europe in 2007, and in the team's first Premier Development League season in 2008, before being called up to the senior Vancouver Whitecaps side. He made his professional debut on July 23, 2008, in a game against Charleston Battery. After releasing in January 2009 was re-signed on 1 May 2009 from Vancouver Whitecaps.

Tech Career
Following his playing career, Mashinchi worked in the analytics department as a performance analyst for the Vancouver Whitecaps   of Major League Soccer for four seasons under head coach Carl Robinson.

Mashinchi has been working in analytics for four-plus years. From June 01, 2014 - December 31, 2014, he joined the analytics department as an intern before getting hired as a full-time analyst and serving the club from January 01, 2015 - February 01, 2018. Through his time with the Vancouver Whitecaps, he attained the Major League Soccer playoffs in 2015, 2017, won the 2015 Amway Canadian Championship, and advanced to the 2017 Concacaf Champions League.

In September 2021, Mashinchi joined Kohl's as a data scientist.

Education
Mashinchi attended Heritage Woods Secondary School and Burnaby Central Secondary from 2006-2008. Following his time as a professional soccer player, he attended the University of British Columbia as a student-athlete playing for the UBC Thunderbirds from 2010-2015. He graduated from the Bachelor of Commerce program at the UBC Sauder School of Business. In 2019, he followed his passion for analytics and pursued a Data Science Master's degree. Mashinchi graduated from the University of Denver's Ritchie School of Engineering and Computer Science in 2021.

Honours
2004: Niederrheinmeister: C-Junioren-Kreisauswahl

References

External links
 Whitecapsfc.com

1989 births
Living people
Iranian footballers
Iranian expatriate footballers
German people of Iranian descent
Canadian people of Iranian descent
Sportspeople of Iranian descent
Vancouver Whitecaps Residency players
Vancouver Whitecaps (1986–2010) players
UBC Thunderbirds soccer players
USL League Two players
USL First Division players
Association football midfielders
Association football defenders